The FCC Record, also known as the Federal Communications Commission Record and variously abbreviated as FCC Rcd. and F.C.C.R., is the comprehensive compilation of decisions, reports, public notices, and other documents of the Federal Communications Commission (FCC), published since 1986. It is a biweekly pamphlet available from the Government Printing Office Superintendent of Documents. Citations should provide the volume, page number and year, in that order, e.g., 1 FCC Rcd. 1 (1986). The FCC Record was preceded by the FCC Reports, which covered the years 1934–1986.

See also
 Federal Register

References

External links
 FCC Record archives from the University of North Texas Libraries

Federal Communications Commission
Publications of the United States government
United States administrative law